Miss Polonia is a national beauty pageant in Poland to select the official ambassador of Poland at the Miss World, Miss Grand International, Miss Intercontinental and Miss Charm pageants. This pageant is the oldest beauty pageant in Poland.

History
Starting in 1927, winners entering Miss Europe. Traditionally, the winner of Miss Polonia represented Poland in Miss World and Miss Universe.

The 1984 Miss Polonia competition ran into multiple problems with rigging accusations. Accusations were made before the event which lead to a boycott. More controversy followed when Joanna Karska was initially chosen as the winner of the competition. The final vote was done a second time and Magdalena Jaworska ended up being declared the winner.

In the 1987 edition of the competition, there was more controversy. The winner of the competition, Monika Nowosadko, came in first place with the 10 male judges and came in last place with the 5 female judges

In 2007, Miss World took away the franchise from Miss Polonia and returned it to the non-related national contest Miss Polski. Since then, the winners of Miss Polonia represent Poland in Miss Universe and the runner-ups represent Poland in Miss Europe, Miss International, Miss Earth and Miss Baltic Sea. Both the Miss Europe and the Miss Baltic Sea pageants get discontinued in 2007 and 2008 respectively and as a result the winners and runner-ups represent the country in Miss Universe, Miss International and Miss Earth.

Since 2015, Miss Polonia lost franchises of Miss Earth and Miss International. Up to now it has only sent its winner to the Miss Universe pageant.

In 2016 after 3 years break, Miss Polonia pageant is back and new titleholder will be selected in October. Winner will represent Poland in Miss Universe 2016.

In 2018 the Miss Polonia is officially owning the franchise of Miss Universe, Miss World and Miss Grand International.

In 2019 Miss Polonia franchised the Miss Intercontinental pageant and relinquished its franchise for Miss Universe, after that, the Miss Universe franchise went to Miss Polski.

In 2020, Miss Polonia franchised the Miss Charm license.

After 7 years, Miss Polonia holds the Miss Earth franchise in 2022.

Titleholders
Note: contest not held in 1931, 1933–1956, 1959–1982, 2014-2015.1932, 1934 and 1937 winners selected in France to represent Poland in Miss Europe.

Winners by Voivodeships

(***) As of 1991 Lwów or Lviv becomes part of the independent Ukraine.
(****) The city of Wilno or Vilnius becomes part of Lithuania.

Voivodeships yet to win:
 Holy Cross
 Subcarpathia

Big Four pageants representatives

Miss World Poland

Miss Polonia started to be franchise holder in 1983, from 1983 to 2007 the Miss Polonia was selecting the winner or runner-up to Miss World competition. From 2007 to 2014 the license of Miss World bought to Miss Polski and continued between 2015 and 2017 the Miss World Poland contest independently selected the winner to Miss World. Started in 2018 the Miss Polonia returned to be national franchise holder of Miss World.

Other International Pageants

Miss Grand Poland

Past Franchises

Miss Universe Poland

The main of Miss Polonia represents her country at Miss Universe. Since Miss Polonia is the only one who franchised the Miss Universe Organization, sometimes the organization designated the runner-up or contestant to be "Miss Universe Poland". Began 2019 the winner of Miss Polski competes at Miss Universe competition. On occasion, when the winner does not qualify (due to age) for either contest, a runner-up is sent.

Miss International Poland

In the beginning the winner of Miss Juwenaliów 1959 participated at Miss International. Since 1985 the Miss International Poland will be selected by Miss Polonia, Miss Polski or one of runners-up from Miss Polonia or Miss Polski pageant. As of 2015 Miss International franchise handled by Miss Polski Organization.

Miss Europe Poland

The winner of Miss Polonia also competed in the Miss Europe pageant.

(***) The city of Wilno or Vilnius becomes part of the independent Lithuania.
(****) As of 1991 Lwów or Lviv becomes part of the independent Ukraine.

Miss Intercontinental Poland

Miss Charm Poland

See also 
Miss Polski
Miss World Poland
Miss Earth Poland

References

External links
 

 
Miss Universe by country
Beauty pageants in Poland
Recurring events established in 1929
1929 establishments in Poland
Polish awards
Poland
Poland
Miss Grand International by country